As We Were Dreaming is a 2015 German film directed by Andreas Dresen, based on the novel of the same name by author Clemens Meyer. It was screened in the main competition section of the 65th Berlin International Film Festival.

Plot
A group of boys in the early stage of the German reunification: Dani, Rico, Mark, and Paul try out some new things after the recent reunification of Berlin and the fall of East Germany. They steal cars, experiment with drugs, and open their own Techno nightclub.

Cast

References

External links
 

2015 films
2015 drama films
German drama films
2010s German-language films
Films directed by Andreas Dresen
Films set in the 1990s
2010s German films